Hans Ettlin (born 10 March 1945) is a Swiss gymnast. He competed at the 1968 Summer Olympics and the 1972 Summer Olympics.

References

External links
 

1945 births
Living people
Swiss male artistic gymnasts
Olympic gymnasts of Switzerland
Gymnasts at the 1968 Summer Olympics
Gymnasts at the 1972 Summer Olympics
People from Obwalden
20th-century Swiss people